|}

The Duchess of Cambridge Stakes is a Group 2 flat horse race in Great Britain open to two-year-old fillies. It is run on the July Course at Newmarket over a distance of 6 furlongs (1,207 metres), and it is scheduled to take place each year in July.

History
The event was established in 1947 as the Cherry Hinton Stakes, and the inaugural running was won by Great Fun.

The present system of race grading was introduced in 1971, and for a period the Duchess of Cambridge Stakes was classed at Group 3 level. It was promoted to Group 2 status in 1996.

The Duchess of Cambridge Stakes is currently held on the second day of Newmarket's three-day July Festival meeting. The equivalent race for male horses is the July Stakes.

Several winners have gone on to achieve victory in the following season's 1,000 Guineas Stakes. The first was Sweet Solera in 1961, and the most recent was Attraction in 2004.

In 2013 the race was renamed the Duchess of Cambridge Stakes in honour of Catherine, Duchess of Cambridge. In the same year the Windsor Forest Stakes at Royal Ascot was renamed the Duke of Cambridge Stakes.

Records
Leading jockey (5 wins):
 Walter Swinburn – Top Socialite (1984), Kerrera (1988), Chicarica (1990), Red Carnival (1994), Wannabe Grand (1998)
 Frankie Dettori - Asfurah (1997), Silent Honor (2001), Sander Camillo (2006), Gamilati (2011), Raffle Prize (2019) 

Leading trainer (4 wins):
 Henry Cecil – Roussalka (1974), Diminuendo (1987), Chimes of Freedom (1989), Musicale (1991)
 Sir Michael Stoute – Top Socialite (1984), Kerrera (1988), Red Carnival (1994), Dazzle (1996)

Winners since 1980

Earlier winners

 1947: Great Fun
 1948: Ballisland
 1949: Diableretta
 1950: Marteline
 1951: Tikva
 1952: Omelia / Pirouette *
 1953: Eastern Glamour
 1954: Lucy Lufton
 1955: no race
 1956: Colonel's Lady
 1957: Munch
 1958: Fan Light
 1959: Panga
 1960: Sweet Solera
 1961: Crepello's Daughter
 1962: Tzigane
 1963: Round Trip
 1964: Greengage
 1965: Chrona
 1966: Pia
 1967: Cease Fire
 1968: Symona
 1969: Wild Wings
 1970: Hecla
 1971: Padrona
 1972: Mysterious
 1973: Celestial Dawn
 1974: Roussalka
 1975: Everything Nice
 1976: Ampulla
 1977: Turkish Treasure
 1978: Devon Ditty
 1979: Mrs Penny

* The 1952 race was a dead-heat and has joint winners.

See also
 Horse racing in Great Britain
 List of British flat horse races

References
 Paris-Turf:
 Racing Post:
 galopp-sieger.de – Duchess of Cambridge Stakes.
 ifhaonline.org – International Federation of Horseracing Authorities – Duchess of Cambridge Stakes (2019).
 pedigreequery.com – Duchess of Cambridge Stakes – Newmarket.
 

Flat races in Great Britain
Newmarket Racecourse
Flat horse races for two-year-old fillies
Recurring sporting events established in 1947
1947 establishments in England